Quebecer, Quebecker or variant may refer to:
 Quebecer (demonym), a native or resident of the province of Quebec
 The Quebecers, a pro-wrestling team
 Quebecer, a native or inhabitant of Quebec City

See also
 French Canadian
 Quebec (disambiguation)
 Québécois (disambiguation)